Come Clean may refer to:

 Come Clean (1931 film), a 1931 short comedy film starring Laurel and Hardy
 Come Clean (2022 film), a 2022 documentary film about drug addiction
 Come Clean (novel) a novel by Terri Paddock
 Come Clean (Curve album) or its title song
 Come Clean (Dwarves album), 2000
 Come Clean (Puddle of Mudd album)
 "Come Clean" (rag), a 1905 rag by Paul Sarebresole
 "Come Clean" (Hilary Duff song), 2003
 "Come Clean" (Jeru the Damaja song), 1993
 "Come Clean", a song by Conrad Sewell from Ghosts & Heartaches, 2018
 Come Clean, a stand-up comedy album by Matt McCarthy